Ian Shoemaker is an American football coach and former player. He is currently the Offensive coordinator at Hawaii. He was the head football coach at Central Washington from 2014 until 2018.

Coaching career

Western Washington
Following Shoemaker's playing career, he joined the staff at Western Washington as an offensive graduate assistant from 1997 to 1999. He coached the tight ends and running backs. During the spring, Shoemaker was also an assistant softball coach for the university.

Minot State
In 2000, Shoemaker spent the spring as the offensive coordinator at Saint Mary before leaving to become the pass game coordinator, quarterbacks and wide receivers coach at Minot State. He held this position from 2000 through 2002. During this time, Shoemaker was also the head baseball coach at St. Mary in 2000, and the head baseball coach at Minot State in 2001 and 2002.

Division III
From 2003 to 2005, Shoemaker was the assistant head coach, offensive coordinator, and quarterbacks coach at Kenyon College in Gambier, Ohio. While at Kenyon, Shoemaker's offensive squads broke 13 school and individual records. He then moved on to Baldwin-Wallace as the offensive coordinator and quarterbacks coach for the 2006 and 2007 seasons.

St. Cloud State
Shoemaker was the co-offensive coordinator and quarterbacks coach at St. Cloud State from 2009 to 2013. Under his guidance, the Husky offensive set multiple school records, including single-season records for points scored in a season, total touchdowns scored, pass efficiency, pass completions, yards per pass, and total offense.

Central Washington
On December 26, 2013, Shoemaker was hired for his first football head coaching opportunity at Central Washington, an NCAA Division II program in Ellensburg, Washington. From 2014 to 2018, Shoemaker led the program to a 38-16 overall record, two Great Northwest Athletic Conference championships (2017 & 2018), and a NCAA playoff appearance (2017). He was named the Don Hansen Super Region 3 Coach of the Year and the GNAC coach of the year in 2017, as well as, with his staff, developing 8 All-Americans over his five-year tenure.

Eastern Washington
In 2019, Shoemaker was hired to his first NCAA FCS position, when he was hired as the offensive coordinator and quarterbacks coach at Eastern Washington.

In his first season, Shoemaker's offense led the NCAA FCS in total offense with an average of 524.8 yards per game, and quarterback Eric Barriere was a finalist for the Walter Payton Award, which is given to the country's top FCS player.

In 2020, Eastern Washington's offense continued to light up the scoreboard, finishing top 5 in the country in scoring (2nd), total offense (3rd), and passing (5th).

In his 3rd and final season at EWU, Shoemaker led the offense to a fast start once again. Through seven games, the Eagles were averaging 54 points a game, over 628 yards a game, and the team was 7–0, but after two straight losses in which the offense was held to nearly half of their season averages, Shoemaker resigned, stating it was a mutual separation that was in the best interest of the team.

Hawaii
Prior to the 2022 season, Shoemaker was hired as the offensive coordinator and quarterbacks coach on Timmy Chang's inaugural staff at Hawaii. It is his first experience at the Division I FBS level.

Playing career
Shoemaker was a four-year starter in both football and baseball at Grinnell College. He was the football Most Valuable Player and Offensive Back of the Year in football and set school records for home runs in a season and career in baseball.

Personal life
After graduating from Orting High School in Orting, Washington, Shoemaker earned a degree in Psychology from Grinnell, and then a master's degree in Sport Psychology from Western Washington.
Shoemaker's brother, Javid, played safety for Eastern Washington from 2001 to 2004 after graduating from Bethel High School in Spanaway, Washington, in 2000.

Head coaching record

College

References

Living people
Year of birth missing (living people)
Players of American football from Washington (state)
Baseball players from Washington (state)
Grinnell Pioneers football players
Grinnell Pioneers baseball players
Western Washington Vikings football coaches
Saint Mary Spires football coaches
Minot State Beavers football coaches
Kenyon Lords football coaches
Baldwin Wallace Yellow Jackets football coaches
St. Cloud State Huskies football coaches
Central Washington Wildcats football coaches
Eastern Washington Eagles football coaches
Hawaii Rainbow Warriors football coaches